Clube Rugby Famalicão is a rugby team based in Vila Nova de Famalicão, Portugal. As of the 2012/13 season, they play in the Second Division of the Campeonato Nacional de Rugby (National Championship).

References

External links
Clube Rugby Famalicão

Portuguese rugby union teams